Prince of the Saddle is a lost 1926 American silent Western film starring Fred Church and Pauline Curley.

Cast
 Fred Church
 Pauline Curley
 William Barrymore as Boris Bullock aka Kit Carson

References

External links
 
 

1926 films
1926 Western (genre) films
Lost Western (genre) films
American black-and-white films
Lost American films
1926 lost films
Silent American Western (genre) films
1920s American films